Wragby is a town and civil parish in the East Lindsey district of Lincolnshire, England.

History 
Wragby is named in the Domesday Book as "Waragebi", when it consisted of 23 households a mill and a church.

The 'Rout Yard', a scheduled monument in the form of two moated islands and associated ditched enclosures, is the remains of a medieval manorial complex. In 1086 there were two manors at Wragby, one in the possession of Erenis of Buron, the other, Waldin the Artificer. The surviving remains possibly represent the Buron manor which held responsibility for a church.  The church was dismantled in 1836 when a new church was established closer to the modern village centre. The 18th century brick-built chancel was kept as a cemetery chapel until the 1980s when it too was demolished.

The ruins of the old church are no longer in evidence, but the local history group has marked out the site of the old church and erected information boards. Some artefacts from the old church can be seen in the present day All Saints' Church. The site of the old church and the associated churchyard have been cleared by members of the Wragby Heritage Group, with financial help from the Heritage Lottery Fund. The site of the old church has been marked out, information boards erected and several damaged tombs and headstones repaired. Work is being carried out in order to map out the position and occupants of the gravesites.

Wragby was a market town and staging centre through a charter dating back to Charles II. The market was held on a Thursday, and there was a fair held on 1 May, and 28–29 September.

A grammar school founded in 1635, and rebuilt in 1775 are both now in residential use. There was also a Grade II listed windmill, built in 1831. It was powered by six sails until 1903 when it ceased working. The 1887 OS Map shows a second windmill off Victoria Street however it has gone in the 1906 map.

The Brady touring company of actors performed here in a temporary theatre in October 1818 before moving on to Bardney.

In 1883 the last European wildcat in England was killed at Bullington Wood, near Wragby.

Over time Wragby has evolved to be a stopping point en route to the coastal town of Skegness, with amenities including three public houses, a fish shop, café and a supermarket. The population of Wragby has expanded though the building of two new housing estates; a third estate began development in late 2009, with completion expected by early 2012. Kier Group initially began the new construction projects after buying-out local homebuilder Hugh Bourn. However, Kier then themselves sold the land and properties to Linden Homes (themselves a subsidiary of Galliford Try), who have continued construction of sites in the town, such as Carpenters Lodge.

The Sinking Ships, a band formed in 1979 known for singing the previously mysterious song 'Strangers', originated from Wragby.

Railway
A station was opened in the town on the Louth to Bardney Line. The station was located on Horncastle Road near the present day Station Mews housing estate. The station was to the east of the town. The station opened in 1874 and closed to passengers in 1951, only to close fully in 1960 to goods traffic. The line has been built over by houses and road alignments, although the station and platform remain as a private residence. There were also stations in the nearby villages of East Barkwith and Kingsthorpe.

Governance
An electoral ward of the same name exists. This ward stretches east with a total population taken at the 2011 Census of 2,469.

References

External links

Towns in Lincolnshire
Civil parishes in Lincolnshire
East Lindsey District